Zainab Ghazi (born November 21, 1992) is a Bahraini actress who started her career in Kuwait in 2013.

Biography
Born in Bahrain, she auditioned with Bahraini directors but received no callbacks. Therefore, she left for Kuwait, where her mother and sister lived. Finally, she was cast by famed director Mohammed Daham Al-Shammari in the 2013 series Sir al Hawa.

Work

Television series

References

External links
 El Cinema page

1992 births
Bahraini television actresses
Living people